The Big Schmooze is an Australian television comedy talk show on The Comedy Channel. The series featured comedy sketches and interviews.

Cast
 Matthew Hardy
 Kate Langbroek
 Dave O'Neil
 Mark O'Toole
 Paul Calleja
 Ray Matsen

See also 
 List of Australian television series

References

External links
 

The Comedy Channel original programming
Australian television talk shows
Australian variety television shows
2000 Australian television series debuts
2001 Australian television series endings